Martin Scorsese Presents the Blues: A Musical Journey is a 2003 box set released on Hip-O Records. It is the soundtrack to the Martin Scorsese PBS documentary series The Blues. The box set attempts to present a history of the blues from the dawning of recorded music to the present day. It offers a survey of many different blues subgenres and tangential music styles, as well as a survey of almost all the most notable blues performers over time.

In 2004, the box set won two Grammy Awards for Best Historical Album and Best Album Notes. The previous year it was number 2 on the Billboards Top Blues Albums chart.

Martin Scorsese Presents the Blues: A Musical Journey is also the title of a 2003 companion book to the series. Writers/editors include Peter Guralnick, Robert Santelli, Holly George-Warren and Christopher John Farley.

Track listing

Disc one

Disc two

Disc three

Disc four

Disc five

References 

2003 compilation albums
2003 soundtrack albums
Blues compilation albums
Grammy Award for Best Historical Album
Television soundtracks